Arcade & Attica No. 18 is a 2-8-0 "Consolidation" type steam locomotive built in 1920 by the American Locomotive Company (ALCO) at its Cooke Works in Paterson, New Jersey.

It was originally built for a sugar mill in Cuba, which canceled its order. ALCO then sold the locomotive to a quarry in New Jersey. The locomotive was sold again in 1929 to the Boyne City Railroad of Boyne City, Michigan. It was used in freight service on its line between Boyne City (where it interchanged with the Pennsylvania Railroad) to Boyne Falls.

In 1962, the Arcade and Attica Railroad (A&A), seeking additional revenue to supplement the freight income, purchased No. 18 and two Boonton-style commuter coaches from Erie Lackawanna Railway. Since then, No. 18 has hauled passenger excursion trains between Arcade and Curriers, with occasional ventures to Java, New York on either passenger or freight trains.

At the close of the 2001 passenger excursion season, No. 18 went into the A&A's workshops for a complete teardown and overhaul to bring it into compliance with the new 49 C.F.R. Part 230, the Federal Railroad Administration's new regulations on steam locomotive inspection and maintenance. Originally expected to last until halfway through the 2002 passenger season, the teardown revealed much work that needed to be completed to bring the locomotive into compliance with the new safety regulations. In 2008, No. 18 finally emerged from the shops after a 6-year-long rebuilding program.

By 2018, the locomotive was again in need of repair and put into the shop to have its condition assessed. In March 2019, it was announced that its condition was worse than anticipated, and it would be out of service through the 2019 season. Repairs include replacement of the firebox, and once completed will allow continued operation. Reassembly was scheduled to begin in Spring of 2021.

The locomotive's tender was swapped in 2018 for one owned by the Oakland B&O Museum in Oakland, Maryland.  The museum had acquired a similar 2-8-0 locomotive from 1920 which had been mated with an oversized tender at some point in its history.  No. 18 had a standard tender of that era, and A&A wanted a larger tender for operational purposes.  So, A&A contacted the museum, and the parties agreed upon an exchange.  The A&A delivered the tender with restoration work done and newly repainted, lettered as a Baltimore & Ohio Railroad unit.

References

ALCO locomotives
Railway locomotives introduced in 1920
2-8-0 locomotives
Standard gauge locomotives of the United States
Preserved steam locomotives of New York